A total lunar eclipse took place on Sunday, March 13, 1960. The moon passed through the center of the Earth's shadow.

This is the 53rd member of Lunar Saros 122. The next event is the March 1978 lunar eclipse.

This eclipse afforded astrophysicist Richard W. Shorthill the opportunity to make the first infrared pyrometric temperature scans of the lunar surface, and led to his discovery of the first lunar "hot spot" observed from Earth.  Shorthill found that the temperature of the floor of the Tycho crater was 216° Kelvin (—57° C), significantly higher than the 160°K (—113° C) in the area around the crater.

Visibility
It was visible from North America, seen rising from Australia, and eastern Asia, and setting from South America, western Europe and Africa.

Related lunar eclipses

Lunar year series

Saros series
It was part of Saros series 122.

Tritos series
 Preceded: Lunar eclipse of April 13, 1949
 Followed: Lunar eclipse of February 10, 1971

Tzolkinex
 Preceded: Lunar eclipse of January 19, 1954
 Followed: Lunar eclipse of April 24, 1967

See also
List of lunar eclipses
List of 20th-century lunar eclipses

Notes

External links

1960-03
1960-03
1960 in science
March 1960 events